In mathematics, the Grothendieck existence theorem, introduced by , gives conditions that enable one to lift infinitesimal deformations of a scheme to a deformation, and to lift schemes over infinitesimal neighborhoods over a subscheme of a scheme S to schemes over S.

The theorem can be viewed as an instance of (Grothendieck's) formal GAGA.

See also 
Chow's lemma

References

.
.

.

formal GAGA

External links

formal GAGA

Theorems in algebraic geometry